The First Falls, a cascade waterfall on an unnamed watercourse, is located in the Mount Lofty Ranges region in the Australian state of South Australia.

Situated within the Cleland National Park, the First Falls are the first of a series of seven waterfalls in Waterfall Gully, south-east of the Adelaide city centre.

See also

 List of waterfalls of South Australia

References

Waterfalls of South Australia
Adelaide Hills
Cascade waterfalls